Established in 1998, the Wattis Institute for Contemporary Arts is a contemporary art center in San Francisco, California, US, and part of the California College of the Arts. It holds exhibitions, lectures, and symposia, releases publications, and runs a residency program, Wattis.

Location and design
The Wattis Institute was originally located on the San Francisco campus of the California College of the Arts at the bottom of Potrero Hill in a refurbished  former Greyhound Bus maintenance facility designed in 1951 by Skidmore, Owings and Merrill. Wattis opened its new location at 360 Kansas Street in January 2013. The facility was redesigned by architect Mark Jensen, best known for his work with the Rooftop Garden at the San Francisco Museum of Modern Art.

Founding and leadership
The Wattis Institute is named after Phyllis C. Wattis, a San Francisco philanthropist who died in June 2002 at the age of 97, and had also served on the boards of the San Francisco Museum of Modern Art, the de Young Museum, the San Francisco Symphony and the San Francisco Opera.

Lawrence Rinder was the founding director of the Institute. It was led by Ralph Rugoff between 2000-2006 and Jens Hoffmann between 2006-2012. The current director is Anthony Huberman, who began his tenure in 2013.

Capp Street Project
The Wattis Institute also runs the Capp Street Project, a visual arts residency dedicated to the creation and presentation of new art installations. It was founded in San Francisco in 1983, and by 2020 had supported over 100 local, national, and international artists through its residency and public exhibition programs.

See also 

 Institute of Contemporary Art San Francisco

References

External links

 CCA Wattis Institute for Contemporary Arts

California College of the Arts
Art museums and galleries in San Francisco
Contemporary art galleries in the United States
Arts centers in California
Potrero Hill, San Francisco
Art galleries established in 1998
1998 establishments in California